Brad Mills may refer to:

Brad Mills (manager) (born 1957), bench coach for the Cleveland Indians
Brad Mills (pitcher) (born 1985), baseball pitcher
Bradley Mills (born 1983), Canadian professional ice hockey player for the Binghamton Senators
Brad Mills (actor), an actor on 3-Headed Shark Attack